Mishui Town is a town and the seat of Hengdong County in Hunan, China. The town of Mishui has 20 villages and 8 communities under its jurisdiction, its seat is Yinbin Community.

History
The town of Mishui was organized through the merger of the former Chengguan Town, Tazhuang Township and Zhenzhu Township and named after the river of Mishui on November 18, 2015.

Chengguan Town
Chengguan Town was reorganized in 1984 from the former Chenguan Commune formed in 1966, it is the southwestern part of the present Mishui Town.

Tazhuang Township
Tazhuang Township was formed in 1956 and it is the southeastern part of the present Mishui Town.

Zhenzhu Township
Zhenzhu Township was a part of Bailian Township in 1950 and formed in 1956, it is the northern part of the present Mishui Town.

Geography
The town of Mishui is located in the northern middle part of Hengdong County. It is bordered by towns of Bailian and Yangqiao to the northeast, Ganxi Town to the southeast, Wuji Town to the south and southwest, Xintang Town to the northwest, Shiwan Town to the north.

Subdivisions
Through the amalgamation of village-level divisions in 2016, its divisions was reduced to 28 from 49.

8 communities
 Binjiang Community
 Jiaxing Community
 Jinyan Community
 Mijiang Community
 Xingdong Community
 Yangshan Community
 Yanwan Community
 Yingbin community

20 villages
 Beichong Village
 Caixia Village
 Dadian Village
 Dashan Village
 Datang Village
 Datuo Village
 Daxing Village
 Hexiang Village
 Jin'e Village
 Jingming Village
 Jinhua Village
 Langshan Village
 Nantang Village
 Shijiang Village
 Tazhuang Village
 Xianlin Village
 Xiannan Village
 Yuexiao Village
 Zhenzhu Village
 Zhuangyuan Village

Notable people
 Wang Guangze (19031934), the Divisional Commander of Red Army Qiandong Independent Division and one of Revolutionary Martyrs. Wang was arrested by the enemy on November 28, 1934 in Xiushan County, Sichuan (modern Chongqing). Chiang Kai-shek ordered Liu Xiang to execute him and Wang was secretly killed in Youyang County on December 21, 1934 when Wang was at his age of 31 years old. Since 1949, the government of Youyang County has been searching for his remains. In April 1982, his remains were found in Yanjiapo, two kilometers from the seat of Longtan Town. The iron shovel was still on the cheekbones of the martyr, and its appearance was appalling. In November 1983, the government of Youyang County buried Wang's remains in the Martyrs’ Cemetery of Longtan Town to build a monument to commemorate forever.

External links
 Official Website (中文 / Chinese)

References

Hengdong County
County seats in Hunan